The Rātana movement is a church and pan-iwi political movement founded by Tahupōtiki Wiremu Rātana (T. W. Ratana) in early 20th-century New Zealand. The Rātana Church (Māori: Te Haahi Rātana) has its headquarters at the settlement of Rātana Pā near Whanganui.

In 2001 the total number of New Zealand residents that were affiliated with the Rātana church was 48,975. In the 2018 New Zealand census, 43,821 people identified with the religion.

History 
The Rātana movement began in 1918 started by T. W. Rātana with the Bible and the Treaty of Waitangi as foundations. Rātana's grandfather was Ngahina and was a signatory of the Treaty of Waitangi for the iwi, Māori nations of Ngā Wairiki and Ngāti Apa. Ngahina was a sheep and cattle station owner, Anglican and pro-government loyalist. Rātana's mother was Methodist. Impacts on Māori in 1918 included land loss, World War I and the influenza epidemic. After the epidemic Rātana became the only male heir of his grandfather. On 8 November 1918 Rātana saw a vision, which he regarded as divinely inspired, asking him to preach the gospel to the Māori people and to cure the spirits and bodies of his people. 

Mere Rikiriki had an influence on Rātana and the Rātana movement. Rikiriki taught Rātana and he often consulted her. She had been at Parihaka with Te Whiti o Rongomai and Tohu Kākahi, had established her own church in Parewanui and was a faith healer and rongoā practitioner. Rikiriki foretold the coming of a new prophet in 1912 that she confirmed was Rātana.

Te Urumanao Ngāpaki Baker was a Māori chief and supported the Rātana movement and was Rātana's wife.

Ture Wairua (spiritual mission) 

The Rātana Church is made up of the Ture Wairua (spiritual laws) and the Ture Tangata (physical laws). The spiritual laws are itemised as the Father, the Son, the Holy Spirit (in Maori, Te Matua, Te Tama me Te Wairua Tapu), and Ngā Anahera Pono (the Holy and Faithful Angels) and also adding Te Māngai (God's Word and Wisdom) to prayers. Its central book is the Bible, although the Blue Book, written in Māori and containing prayers and hymns (many composed by Rātana), is used in all church services.

Until 1924 he preached to increasingly large numbers of Māori and established a name for himself as the "Māori Miracle Man". At first, the movement was seen as a Christian revival, but it soon moved away from mainstream churches. On 31 May 1925, Te Haahi Rātana (the Rātana Church) was established as a separate church and its founder was acknowledged as the bearer of Te Mangai or God's Word and Wisdom. On 21 July 1925, the constitution of the Rātana Church was accepted by the Registrar-General and a list of 'apostles' (ministers) who were authorised to conduct marriages was published in the New Zealand Gazette.

Ture Tangata (secular movement) 

In 1924 a group of 38 people including Rātana and his wife Te Urumanao Ngāpaki Baker and spokesperson Pita Moko journeyed to Europe to unsuccessfully present a petition to George V and the League of Nations on land confiscations and the Treaty of Waitangi.  Later trips were made to the U.S. and Canada. These trips were not without controversy. The New Zealand Government acted to prevent the petition being presented to the monarch, and the visit to Japan on the way back from Europe created allegations of disloyalty and of flying the Japanese flag over the church settlement of Rātana Pā.

When the Rātana temple (Te Temepara Tapu o Ihoa (The Holy Temple of Jehovah)) which Rātana saw as embodying in its architecture deep Biblical truths (especially the two magnificent bell towers)  was opened on 25 January 1928 by Japanese Bishop Juji Nakada (with whom Ratana and party had stayed in 1924), Rātana declared his spiritual work was complete and church apostles and officers would take on the work. He now turned more to political work for Māori in New Zealand.

Koata (political movement) 

As early as 1923, Rātana had declared an interest in party politics, and his eldest son Haami Tokouru Rātana had stood for the Western Maori electorate as an independent candidate. Now Rātana was determined to capture the Māori electorates to give a voice for his movement.

In January 1928, Rātana called himself Piri Wiri Tua and called on four followers to be the quarters of his body and rule the land. The "first cut" was Paraire Karaka Paikea in the north, Haami Tokouru Rātana in the west, Pita Moko in the east, and Eruera Tirikatene in the south.  Moko was later replaced by Tiaki Omana, in the "second cut". The covenant signed by the men promised they would not rest, and their wives separately agreed that they would go barefoot and in rags to represent the Rātana movement. All four went on to capture the Maori seats between 1932 and 1943.

Rātana candidates stood in the 1928 and 1931 general elections and in the 1930 by-election in Western Maori following the death of Maui Pomare, but they did not succeed. The first Rātana movement MP was Eruera Tirikatene, elected in a by-election for Southern Maori in June 1932. He was followed by Haami Tokouru Rātana (known as Toko) in Western Maori in the 1935 general election. In the 1938 election, the third Māori electorate of Northern Maori was captured by Paraire Karaka Paikea, and the last (Eastern Maori) was won by Tiaki Omana in the 1943 election.

The Rātana Independent Members of Parliament were the first to represent a political party in which most party members were Māori. Major aims of the movement were statutory recognition of the Treaty of Waitangi, righting the confiscation grievances of the Māori people, and equality in social welfare for Māori.

Politicians usually attend the Rātana marae to take part in celebrations marking T.W. Ratana's birthday and in January 2023 it was the 150th anniversary. The political party leaders who attended on this occasion were Labour, National, Greens, Māori Party and New Zealand First. Commentator Merepeka Raukawa-Tait stated the message from Māori speakers to the politicians were: "They want to have relationships that are more than transactional and they are not interested in politics and politicians that stir up fear."

Alliance with the Labour Party 
Following the formation of the First Labour Government in 1935, the two Rātana MPs agreed to vote with Labour. This alliance was formalised with the Rātana movement joining the Labour Party in a meeting between Rātana and Prime Minister Michael Savage on 22 April 1936. The Prime Minister was given four symbolic gifts: a potato, a broken gold watch, a pounamu hei-tiki, and a huia feather. The potato represented loss of Māori land and means of sustenance, the broken watch represented the broken promises of the Treaty of Waitangi, and the pounamu represented the mana of the Māori people. If Savage could restore these three, he would earn the right to wear the huia feather to signify his chiefly status. The gifts were regarded as so precious they were buried with Savage at his state funeral in 1940.

The four Māori electorates were held by Rātana-affiliated members of Labour for decades: until 1963 for the Eastern Maori electorate, 1980 for Northern Maori, and 1996 for Western and Southern Maori electorates. Not all Labour Party Māori MPs have been members of the Rātana Church, but all Māori electorates were held by Labour MPs who had at least been endorsed by the church until Tau Henare won Northern Maori in the 1993 New Zealand general election. In both the parliaments of 1946–1948 and 1957–1960, the formation of a Labour Government depended on the votes of the Rātana Movement members. 

Rātana movement Members of Parliament have included Tapihana Paraire Paikea, Haami Tokouru Rātana, Matiu Rātana, Iriaka Rātana, Koro Wētere, Paraone Reweti, Matiu Rata, and Whetu Tirikatene-Sullivan. Mita Ririnui, who held the Māori seat of Waiariki from 1999 to 2005 and was a List MP from 2005 to 2011, is a Rātana minister.

Symbols 
The main symbol (tohu) of the church is a five-pointed star and crescent moon, the whetū mārama (which means both "star and moon" and "shining star"), which is worn on the lapels of mōrehu (the scattered remnant, Rātana followers) and at pivotal points on church buildings. The golden or blue crescent moon (symbolising enlightenment) can face different parts of the coloured star: blue represents Te Matua (The Father), white is Te Tama (The Son), red is Te Wairua Tapu (The Holy Spirit), purple is Ngā Anahera Pono (The Faithful Angels) and gold/yellow is Te Māngai (The Mouthpiece (of Jehovah), Ture Wairua), although this colour is sometimes substituted for the colour pink, representing PiriWiriTua (The Campaigner (of Political Matters), Ture Tangata). Te Whetū Mārama represents the kingdom of light or Māramatanga, standing firm against the forces of darkness (mākutu).

Church leaders 
 Tahupotiki Wiremu Rātana (1925–1939)
 Haami Tokouru Rātana (1939–1944)
 Matiu Rātana (1944–1950)
 Puhi o Aotea Ratahi (1950–1966)
 Maata "Te Reo" Hura (1966–1991)
 Raniera Te Aou Hou Rātana (1991–1998)
 Harerangi Meihana (1998–2022)

References

Further reading

Books 
 Henderson, J. McLeod (1963). Ratana: The Origins and the Story of the Movement. Polynesian Society.
 Henderson, J. McLeod (1972). Ratana: The Man, The Church, The Political Movement (2nd ed.). A.H & A.W. Reed in association with the Polynesian Society. . 2nd ed. of Henderson (1963).
 Newman, Keith (2006). Ratana Revisited: An Unfinished Legacy. Reed. .
 Newman, Keith (2009). Ratana the Prophet. Raupo-Penguin. . A condensed version of Newman (2006).

Other
 Hebert, D. G. (2008). Music Transculturation and Identity in a Maori Brass Band Tradition. In R. Camus & B. Habla, (Eds.), Alta Musica, 26 (pp. 173–200). Tutzing: Schneider.
 Newman, Keith (2002). A Sleeping Giant
 
 Westra, Ans (1963). T. W. Ratana and the Ratana Church photos

External links 
 Te Haahi Ratana: The Official Website of the Ratana Established Church of New Zealand by Arahi R. Hagger

Rātanas
Māori politics
New Zealand Labour Party
Māori organisations
Māori political parties in New Zealand
Māori religion
Indigenous Christianity
Political movements in New Zealand
Christian denominations in New Zealand
Christian political parties in New Zealand